Walker's salamander (Bolitoglossa walkeri) is a species of salamander in the family Plethodontidae.
It is endemic to Colombia.

Its natural habitat is subtropical or tropical moist montane forests.

References

Bolitoglossa
Amphibians of Colombia
Endemic fauna of Colombia
Taxonomy articles created by Polbot
Amphibians described in 1972